Pseudo-Ignatius was a 4th-century writer who claimed to be Ignatius of Antioch. He is the author of the Ignatian forgeries but he also wrote the Apostolic Constitutions and a Commentary on Job. Harnack also identified Pseudo-Clement with Pseudo-Ignatius. Pseudo-Ignatius has some Arian leanings, but not completely Arian, yet on the hand, he in some ways resembles the Apollinarians. However it is not possible to draw clear conclusions on his Christology.

According to Bart D. Ehrman, the writer likely claimed the name Ignatius to bolster his own theological views.

Theology 
Pseudo-Ignatius opposed asceticism and he had Arian leanings. In the Apostolic Constitutions, he held 1-3 Maccabees, 1-2 Clement and possibly Judith as canonical (however some manuscripts lack Judith), but denied the canonical status of the Book of Revelation.

Pseudo-Ignatius in the Apostolic Constitutions affirmed peadocommunion. and Baptism by immersion.

Writings 
Epistles attributed to Pseudo-Ignatius include:

 Epistle to the Tarsians
 Epistle to the Antiochians
 Epistle to Hero, a Deacon of Antioch
 Epistle to the Philippians
 The Epistle of Maria the Proselyte to Ignatius
 Epistle to Mary at Neapolis, Zarbus
 First Epistle to St. John
 Second Epistle to St. John
 The Epistle of Ignatius to the Virgin Mary
 The Apostolic Constitutions
 Commentary on Job

References 

4th-century Arian Christians
4th-century Christian theologians
4th-century Romans